The 2014 Women's European Volleyball League was the sixth edition of the annual Women's European Volleyball League, which featured women's national volleyball teams from eight European countries.

Turkey defeated Germany 6–2 in the final, which was played over two legs, to capture their first title.

Format
This year saw no final four tournament. Instead the eight teams were split into two pools and played a round robin with playing three matchups at home and away, making a total of twelve games for each team. The top placed team of each group advanced to the final.

Teams

League round

Pool A

|}

Leg 1

|}

Leg 2

|}

Leg 3

|}

Leg 4

|}

Leg 5

|}

Leg 6

|}

Pool B

|}

Leg 1

|}

Leg 2

|}

Leg 3

|}

Leg 4

|}

Leg 5

|}

Leg 6

|}

Final

|}

|}

Final standing

Awards
MVP:  Kübra Akman

References

External links
Official website

2014 Women
European Volleyball League